Isaac Weetra (born 27 February 1989) is a semi-professional Australian rules footballer.

He is notable for his brief Australian Football League (AFL) stint, playing with the Melbourne Demons.

Early life
In 2006 he represented Australia's indigenous youth on tour to South Africa with the "Flying Boomerangs" to play against the South African Buffaloes.

Weetra was recruited from Port Adelaide Magpies in the South Australian National Football League (SANFL) with selection number 62 in the 2006 AFL Draft. In 2005, he was awarded the Naish Travers Medal for best on ground during the Whyalla Football League Grand Final, playing for his club West Whyalla. Weetra’s older brother Paul won the 2007 T.A Evans medal for the reserves league best & fairest playing for his club South Whyalla.

AFL
Weetra debuted in the AFL in round 1, 2008 against Hawthorn at the Melbourne Cricket Ground. He was dropped after his second game against the Western Bulldogs and played the rest of the season for Melbourne's VFL-affiliate, Sandringham in the Victorian Football League (VFL).

Weetra was delisted by Melbourne at the conclusion of the 2008 season.

Post AFL
Weetra returned to the Port Adelaide Magpies in the SANFL for the start of the 2009 season.

Weetra moved onto the Canning Tigers Football Club in Western Australia and later the successful Big Dawgs AFL 9's team. Weetra won the best and fairest in 2013 after finishing a distant second behind Cameron Jackson, formerly of HBL in the south west, in 2012. Jackson has gone on to win a further three of his own including a classic 2021 count where he knocked off current icon Billy Young. Jackson has also received life membership.

Weetra returned to the Canning South Perth footy club in 2022 as part of a wildly successful reserves team that went on to win the flag. Weetra dominated across half back on the big day and was pipped of best on ground honours by perennial umpires pet and local enforcer, ruckman Monte Pollard. 

Club officials hope to see Weetra back in 2023.

References

External links

1989 births
Living people
Australian rules footballers from South Australia
Melbourne Football Club players
Indigenous Australian players of Australian rules football
Port Adelaide Magpies players
Sandringham Football Club players